The 7th Australian Academy of Cinema and Television Arts Awards (generally known as the AACTA Awards) took place on 6 December 2017. Presented by the Australian Academy of Cinema and Television Arts (AACTA), the awards celebrated the best in Australian feature film, television, documentary and short film productions of 2017. A record number of thirty five feature films were submitted for competition. The main ceremony was televised in Australia by the Seven Network.

Recipients and nominations

Feature film

Television

Subscription television

Documentary and short film

Additional awards

Special awards
Longford Lyell Award – Phillip Noyce (director)
Trailblazer Award – Simon Baker (actor)
Byron Kennedy Award – Martin Butler and Bentley Dean (filmmakers)

References

External links
 The Australian Academy of Cinema and Television Arts official website

AACTA Awards ceremonies
AACTA Awards
AACTA Awards
AACTA Awards